Epigonus is the Latinized form of epigonos ("progeny"). It can refer to:

Personal name 
 Epigonos, pseudonym of Karl Adolph Gjellerup
 Epigonos of Telmessos, second son of Ptolemy I Epigone
 Antipater Epigonos, son of Epigonos of Telmessus
 Ptolemy Epigonos, co-regent of Egypt with Ptolemy II
 Epigonus, sculptor of the Pergamene school
 Epigonus of Ambracia, 6th century BC Greek musician
 Epigonion, a musical instrument invented by Epigonus of Ambracia
 Epigonus of Thessalonica, author of two epigrams in the Greek Anthology

Greek mythology 
 Epigoni Sons of the failed Seven against Thebes.

Scientific name 
 Vexillum epigonus, species of small sea snail
 Epigonus (fish), genus of cardinalfishes